Coen Christian Gortemaker (born 29 January 1994) is a Dutch former professional footballer who played as a left back. He played for FC Twente, Heracles Almelo, Achilles '29, and HHC Hardenberg.

Career
Gortemaker was born in Enschede. He made his debut for FC Twente on 12 July 2012 in Europa League.

References

External links
 
 Profile at the Voetbal International 
 

Living people
1994 births
Footballers from Enschede
Association football fullbacks
Dutch footballers
FC Twente players
Heracles Almelo players
Achilles '29 players
Eredivisie players
Eerste Divisie players